Gondola Group was a chain restaurant operator in the United Kingdom and Ireland. It operated several casual dining brands:
Byron Hamburgers, sold to Hutton Collins for £100 million in October 2013.
Kettners, champagne bar and restaurant (one site in London), sold in 2013/2014.
PizzaExpress, sold to the China based private equity firm Hony Capital in July 2014 for £900 million ($1.54 billion).
ASK Italian and Zizzi, Italian food. Sold to Bridgepoint Capital in February 2015 for £250 million.

References

External links

Restaurants in the Republic of Ireland
Restaurant groups in the United Kingdom
Companies based in the City of Westminster